Helen Klaos ( Reino; born 25 January 1983) is an Estonian badminton player.

Career 
She played at the 2005 World Badminton Championships in Anaheim and lost in the first round to Mia Audina of the Netherlands.

References

External links 
 
 European results

1983 births
Living people
People from Nõo Parish
Estonian female badminton players
Badminton coaches